This is a list of electoral division results for the 2010 Australian federal election for the state of South Australia.

Overall

Results by division

Adelaide

Barker

Boothby

Grey

Hindmarsh

Kingston

Makin

Mayo

Port Adelaide

Sturt

Wakefield

See also 

 2010 Australian federal election
 Results of the 2010 Australian federal election (House of Representatives)
 Post-election pendulum for the 2010 Australian federal election
 Members of the Australian House of Representatives, 2010–2013

References 

South Australia 2010